The North Terminal Garage is a historic parking garage on 600 Commercial Street in the North End of Boston, Massachusetts.  The three-story concrete garage was built in 1925 to a design by Little & Russell.  It is a rare surviving parking facility from such an early date, and is further notable as the site of the Great Brink's Robbery on January 17, 1950.  The building was listed on the National Register of Historic Places in 1997.

A plaque on the front of the building identifies it as the site on which "illuminating gas was first commercially manufactured in New England in 1828."

See also 
 National Register of Historic Places listings in northern Boston, Massachusetts

References

Commercial buildings on the National Register of Historic Places in Massachusetts
Transportation buildings and structures in Boston
National Register of Historic Places in Boston
North End, Boston
Garages (parking) on the National Register of Historic Places
Transportation buildings and structures on the National Register of Historic Places in Massachusetts
1925 establishments in Massachusetts